Maple Springs is a historic home and farm located at Jeffersonton, Culpeper County, Virginia. It was built in three sections.  The first section is of heavy mortise-and-tenon frame construction; section two is of planked log construction, and appears to have been built about 1775 and joined to form a hall-parlor-plan dwelling in the mid-1800s; and section three is of lighter and cruder frame construction, was originally a detached or semi-detached unit that was joined to the house around 1900 to serve as a kitchen.  It features large fieldstone chimneys on the first and second section gable ends, one with a brick stack.

It was listed on the National Register of Historic Places in 1997.

References

Houses on the National Register of Historic Places in Virginia
Houses completed in 1775
Houses in Culpeper County, Virginia
National Register of Historic Places in Culpeper County, Virginia